Canadian Pacific is a Canadian railway.

Canadian Pacific may also refer to:

Canadian Pacific (film), a 1949 Western
"Canadian Pacific" (song), a 1969 single by George Hamilton IV
Canadian Pacific Air Lines, a Canadian airline
Canadian Pacific Building (disambiguation), the name of several buildings
Canadian Pacific Limited, a subsidiary company of Canadian Pacific Railway
Canadian Pacific Steamships, a shipping company

See also

Canadian Northern Pacific Railway, a historic Canadian railway 
Royal Canadian Pacific, a luxury excursion passenger train 
British Columbia Coast, or the Canadian Pacific coast